Cartoon All-Stars to the Rescue is a 1990 American animated television film starring many characters from several animated television series at the time of its release. Financed by McDonald's, Ronald McDonald Children's Charities, it was originally simulcast for a limited time on April 21, 1990 on all four major American television networks (by supporting their Saturday morning characters): ABC, CBS, NBC, and Fox, and most independent stations, as well as various cable networks. McDonald's released a VHS home video edition of the special distributed by Buena Vista Home Video, which opened with an introduction from President George H. W. Bush, First Lady Barbara Bush and their dog, Millie. It was produced by the Academy of Television Arts & Sciences Foundation and Southern Star Productions, and was animated overseas by Wang Film Productions. The musical number "Wonderful Ways to Say No" was written by Academy Award-winning composer, Alan Menken and lyricist Howard Ashman, who also wrote the songs for Disney's The Little Mermaid, Beauty and the Beast, and Aladdin.

The plot chronicles the exploits of Michael, a young teenage boy who is using marijuana as well as stealing, and drinking alcohol. His younger sister, Corey, is worried about him because he started acting differently which becomes a concern for their parents (who are also starting to notice his changes). When Corey's piggy bank goes missing one morning, her cartoon toys come to life to help her find it. After discovering it in Michael's room along with his stash of drugs, they proceed to work together to do an intervention and take him on a fantasy journey to teach him the risks and consequences a life of drug abuse can bring.

Plot 
In Corey's room, an unseen person steals her piggy bank off her dresser. The theft is witnessed by Papa Smurf, who emerges from a Smurfs comic book with the other Smurfs and alerts the other cartoon characters in the room (Alf from a framed picture, Garfield from a lamp, Alvin and the Chipmunks from a record sleeve, Winnie the Pooh from a stuffed animal, Baby Kermit from an alarm clock, and Slimer who passes through a wall).

Alf, Garfield, Alvin, Simon, and Theodore track down the thief and discover that it is Michael, Corey's brother. Alvin opens a box under his bed and Simon identifies its contents as marijuana. Meanwhile, Corey expresses her concerns about his change in behavior, causing him to storm out of the house. The cartoon characters realize that something must be done about his addiction and they set off after him, leaving Pooh behind to look after Corey.

At the arcade, Michael smokes pot with his old "friends" and "Smoke", an anthropomorphic cloud of smoke, who try to convince him to try harder drugs. They run out and are chased into an alley by a police officer, who is revealed to be Bugs Bunny wearing a police officer's hat. He traps Smoke in a garbage can and uses a time machine to see when and how Michael's addiction started. It turns out that it did so through peer pressure by some older high school kids. After he has returned to the present, he meets up with his "friends" and they decide they want to do some crack. He is hesitant until one of them steals his wallet. He and Smoke chase after her, until they fall down a manhole and meet up with Michelangelo, who tells them that the drugs are messing up his brain. Baby Kermit, Baby Miss Piggy, and Baby Gonzo take him on a tour of the human brain. There, Huey, Dewey, and Louie, and Tigger join the rest of the cartoon characters in trying to teach him the many "Wonderful Ways to Say No".

Michael wakes up in his room, believing the whole thing to be nothing but a nightmare. Corey walks in and tries to talk to him, but he loses his temper and angrily yells at her, nearly breaking her arm and hurling her to a wall. He comes to his senses and tries to apologize to her, but she runs out frightened. Smoke appears and tells him he did the right thing, but he is not sure. Saddened, he looks at himself in a small mirror and is shocked to see Alf looking at him. Alf grabs him and pulls him into the mirror. Inside a hall of mirrors, Alf shows him his reflection of how he is today, then the one if he does not stop taking drugs: an aged, corpse-like version of himself. When he insists that he could quit if he wants to and that he is in charge of his own life, Alf takes him to see the "man in charge". He is horrified to see that it is Smoke.

Corey and Pooh go back into Michael's room and find his box of marijuana. Smoke appears, throws Pooh into a cabinet, and starts tempting Corey into trying it. She believes that if she does so, then maybe she and Michael could have fun together like they used to before he started doing drugs.

Meanwhile, the drug-induced carnival in Michael's mind leads him to Daffy Duck who reads his future in his crystal ball - after failing to read it from a bowling ball - and it is a sicklier version of himself than before. After one last warning from the cartoon characters, he, now ashamed of himself and his drug addiction, comes back into his room just in time to stop Corey from using the drugs herself. He tells her that he never wants to see her end up like him, and admits he was wrong for using them in the first place, though he is unsure if he can change despite his obvious desire to do so. She advises him to talk about his problems with her and their parents. Smoke tries to persuade him otherwise, but he grabs him and throws him out the window, as he feels that he has "listened to {him} long enough". After falling in a garbage truck, Smoke vows to return, but all of the cartoon characters appear on a poster on Michael's wall as a reminder to always say no when confronted by drugs. He releases Pooh from the cabinet and smiles down at Corey as they go talk to their parents about his drug addiction.

Characters  
The characters, from 10 different franchises, are:

The Smurfs: Papa Smurf, Brainy Smurf, Hefty Smurf (Although Smurfette is seen on the poster and VHS cover, she actually does not appear in the special.)
ALF: The Animated Series: ALF
Garfield and Friends: Garfield
Alvin and the Chipmunks: Alvin, Simon, Theodore
The New Adventures of Winnie the Pooh: Winnie the Pooh, Tigger
Muppet Babies: Baby Kermit, Baby Miss Piggy, Baby Gonzo
The Real Ghostbusters: Slimer
Looney Tunes: Bugs Bunny, Daffy Duck (Wile E. Coyote is mentioned but not seen, but his time machine was used by Bugs.)
Teenage Mutant Ninja Turtles: Michelangelo (Although he appears in the special, he is not shown on the poster or VHS cover.)
DuckTales: Huey, Dewey, and Louie

Voice cast 
The various character owners licensed them freely due to the public service aspect of the special.

The special marked the first time the characters Bugs Bunny and Daffy Duck were voiced by someone other than Mel Blanc, who had died shortly before the production, prompting Warner Bros. to enlist Jeff Bergman in his place.

Broadcast 
The special was screened in Australia in November 1990. Like the U.S. broadcast, it aired simultaneously on Australia's major commercial networks (Seven Network, Nine Network and Network Ten). Prime Minister Bob Hawke introduced the Australian screening. It was screened in New Zealand in December on both TV One and Channel 2 simultaneously. Prime Minister Jim Bolger introduced it instead of the U.S. president. It was screened in Canada on the CBC, CTV, and Global Television Networks and most independent stations shortly after its original U.S. broadcast, although all of the characters had their respective shows aired on either CTV or Global but not CBC. Canadian Prime Minister Brian Mulroney introduced it. The special was broadcast in Brazil in 1994, as Rede Manchete made Portuguese Brazilian dubbing in Herbert Richers Dubbing Studios.

In the United States, all superstations and a handful of independent stations (mainly in selected cities) aired the special, but some stations aired the special at a different period during the week the special aired on the Big Four stations and a number of cable networks. Superstations WPIX in New York City, WGN-TV in Chicago, KTLA in Los Angeles, KTVT in Dallas, WKBD-TV in Detroit, KHTV in Houston, WVTV in Milwaukee, KSTW in Tacoma/Seattle, and KWGN in Denver premiered the special at the same time the big four networks and cable systems premiered, with St. Louis' KPLR-TV premiered the special two hours later after its television premiere. New York's WWOR-TV and Boston's WSBK-TV would later premiere the special the following morning on April 22.

United States
 ABC
 USA Network
 CBS
 NBC
 FOX
 Univision
 Telemundo
 Nickelodeon
 MTV
 Disney Channel
 Lifetime
 TBS
 TNT
 Syndication
 PBS (participating stations)

Australia
 Seven Network
 Nine Network
 Network Ten

New Zealand
 TV One
 Channel Two

Canada
 CBC
 CTV
 Global
 Radio-Canada
 TVA
 TQS
 Canadian syndication

Brazil
 Rede Manchete

References

External links 

 
 
 
 Cartoon All-Stars to the Rescue: joint hearing before the Senate Committee on the Judiciary and the House Committee on the Judiciary, One Hundred First Congress, second session, on an entertaining way of enlightening children about the dangers of substance abuse, April 19, 1990

1990 animated films
1990s American animated films
1990s American television specials
1990s animated television specials
1990s English-language films
1990 films
1990 television specials
Alvin and the Chipmunks films
American Broadcasting Company television specials
American films about cannabis
American social guidance and drug education films
Anti-cannabis media
Animated crossover films
Animated crossover television specials
Animated films based on comics
Animated Teenage Mutant Ninja Turtles films
CBS television specials
Crossover animation
Crossover fiction
Disney television specials
Films about addiction
Films about cannabis
Films about cocaine
Films about drugs
Bugs Bunny films
Daffy Duck films
Fox television specials
Garfield films
NBC television specials
Network 10 specials
Nine Network specials
Seven Network specials
Simulcasts
Television shows about drugs
The Smurfs in film
Winnie-the-Pooh specials